Microphorus may refer to two different genera of insects:
 Microphorus, a synonym for Microphor, a genus of flies
 Microphorus, a synonym for Microplophorus, a genus of beetles